M.C. and Others v Italy (also known as Affaire M. C. et Autres c. Italie) is a case decided by the European Court of Human Rights (ECHR) on 3 September 2013 in which Article 1 of Protocol 1 (A1P1) was engaged due to the applicants not being afforded annual uprating which the court deemed damage to their property of a disproportionate character in the form of an exorbitant charge. The Strasbourg ruling sets an important precedent for higher monthly compensation payments to be paid to the 60,000 or so victims of contaminated blood transfusions in Italy.

Background
The applicants were 162 Italian nationals who had either received blood transfusions or blood products contaminated with various blood-borne viruses. The applicants, all of whom were given anonymity, complained that part of the compensation they received because of the contamination was not being afforded an annual reassessment according to the inflation rate. Following transfusions or the administration of blood derivatives, the applicants were infected with the human immunodeficiency virus (HIV), and/or hepatitis B and/or hepatitis C. Forty of the applicants or their relatives suffered from haemophilia, a condition that requires frequent infusions of blood products. The other applicants were infected through blood transfusions carried out during hospital treatment.

The compensation was to include a supplementary indemnity, in Italian ″indennità integrativa speciale″, abbreviated to ″IIS″. This indemnity component (IIS) was to be subject to reassessment based on the annual rate of inflation and was intended to prevent or reduce the effects of currency devaluation. However, the Italian government made interventions as to the re-assessment of this supplementary allowance (the IIS) as they believed that it was not possible to uprate the amount in line with inflation. In the absence of the annual revaluation, the monetary value of the IIS was fated to gradually decrease.  In addition, the IIS was thought to represent between 90% and 95% of the total amount of the compensation.  The applicants presented accountancy expertise demonstrating that those who had a right to the revaluation of the IIS were being deprived every month of around 200 euros.

Applicant's situation
During the case, the health of several of the applicants suffered serious deterioration due to the viruses with which they were infected.  The infection with contaminated blood and blood products had led to some suffering liver cirrhosis, liver cancer, or a combination of several pathologies, in some, both AIDS and hepatitis.  In some cases, this was often accompanied by the underlying condition of haemophilia. One applicant suffered from a nervous breakdown leading to several suicide attempts.

From the point the case application had been communicated to the Italian government, six applicants unfortunately died. Their heirs were then established in the Court proceedings.

The applicants provided medical certificates and expert medical reports showing the reduced life expectancy of people infected with the hepatitis virus and HIV.  The expert evidence made out a strict link between the applicant's prognosis of survival and the beneficial effect of the compensation allowances in question. 

The Court considered that they were obligated to take the pathologies of the applicants into account. In particular, how during the proceedings, six of them had died. The judges also attached particular importance to the fact that the annual reassessment (the IIS) represented more than 90% of the total amount of the compensation paid to the applicants.

Relevant law
Under Law No. 210/1992, the applicants had already received compensation from the Italian Ministry of Health for the permanent damage they suffered as a result of their contamination.

Law No. 210/1992 stated that additional compensation, ″indennizzo ulteriore″, is to be granted to persons who have suffered damage as a result of compulsory vaccinations and that this additional compensation should be subject to an annual reassessment based on the rate of inflation. Since February 1992, the entitlement under Law No. 210/1992 to compensation from the state for anyone who had suffered permanent injury from compulsory vaccinations had been extended to those who had been infected with HIV as a result of blood products and/or those who had suffered irreversible damage due to post-transfusion hepatitis. The court was unable to identify any disparity in treatment between those who had been affected by post-transfusion hepatitis and those who had suffered permanent damage as a result of compulsory vaccinations.

The applicant's arguments relied on various articles and protocols of the European Convention on Human Rights as follows: Article 6 section 1, Article 13, Article 14, Article 1 of Protocol No. 1 and Article 1 of Protocol No. 12.

Judgment
The judges decided unanimously that the applicants had suffered damage to their property of a disproportionate character due to the adoption by the Italian government of Legislative Decree No. 78/2010. This decree placed an ″abnormal and exorbitant charge″ (″charge anormale et exorbitante″) on the applicants, and in the opinion of the court upset the fair balance between the demands of the general interest and the safeguarding of individual's fundamental rights.

The judges were unanimous in finding that there had been a violation of Article 14 of the Convention along with a declaration that the application was admissible under A1P1 (Article 1 of Protocol No. 1).

By way of remedy, the Italian government was required by the ECHR to set, within 6 months, a time–limit by which the State must undertake to guarantee the payment of the re–assessed IIS to any applicant entitled to the compensation under Law no. 210/1992 and that the payments should be back-dated to the point from which it had been granted to them. The increase would also have to be paid to everyone in a comparable situation where the adjusted supplementary allowances had not been paid.

Pilot judgment 

This ruling was one of a limited number of pilot judgments made by the Court.  The potential number of people in Italy who were likely to be systemically affected by the same issue was taken into consideration by the Court and by way of consequence chose to implement the pilot judgement procedure. The respondent state was required to address not only the applicant case but all similar cases. The Court "also noted the urgent need to provide the persons concerned appropriate redress at national level."

See also
 A and Others v National Blood Authority and Another (UK Consumer law case involving claimants infected with hepatitis C)
 CN v Secretary of State for Health and Social Care (Permission appeal challenging non-inclusion of hepatitis B sufferers)
 Contaminated blood scandal in the United Kingdom
 Contaminated haemophilia blood products (mentions contaminated blood in Italy)
 R (March) v Secretary of State for Health, 2010 judicial review by a claimant treated with contaminated blood products.

References

2013 in case law
European Court of Human Rights cases involving Italy
Article 1 of Protocol No. 1 of the European Convention on Human Rights
Article 6 of the European Convention on Human Rights
Article 14 of the European Convention on Human Rights
Contaminated blood case law